The 2018–19 Louisiana Ragin' Cajuns men's basketball team represented the University of Louisiana at Lafayette during the 2018–19 NCAA Division I men's basketball season. The Ragin' Cajuns were led by ninth-year head coach Bob Marlin and played their home games at the Cajundome as members of the Sun Belt Conference. They finished the season 19–13 overall, 10–8 in Sun Belt play to finish in fifth place. As the No. 5 seed in the Sun Belt tournament, they lost in the second round to South Alabama.

Previous season
The Ragin' Cajuns finished the 2017–18 season 27–7, 16–2 in Sun Belt play to win the Sun Belt regular season championship. The conference championship was the school's first since first regular-season title since sharing the 2000 title and its first outright title since joining the conference in 1991. They defeated Texas State in the quarterfinals of the Sun Belt tournament before losing in the semifinals to UT Arlington. As a regular season conference champion who failed to win their conference tournament, they received an automatic bid to the National Invitation Tournament where they lost in the first round to LSU.

Roster

Schedule and results

|-
!colspan=9 style=| Non-conference regular season

|-
!colspan=9 style=| Sun Belt regular season

|-
!colspan=9 style=| Sun Belt tournament

References 

Louisiana Ragin' Cajuns men's basketball seasons
Louisiana-Lafayette
Louisiana
Louisiana